Henry Gilbert may refer to:
 Henry Gilbert (author) (1868–1937), children's author
 Henry F. Gilbert (1868–1928), American composer
 Henry Gilbert (actor) (1913–1973), English-born Australian actor

See also

 Harry Gilbert (disambiguation)